Touch the World is the fourteenth studio album by American band Earth, Wind & Fire, released in November 1987 on Columbia Records. The album reached No. 3 on the Billboard Top R&B Albums chart and No. 33 on the Billboard Top Pop Albums chart. Touch the World was certified Gold in the US by the RIAA.

Overview
Touch the World was produced by Earth, Wind & Fire leader Maurice White. 
Artists such as George Duke, Marc Russo and Ricky Lawson of Yellowjackets, Jeff Porcaro of Toto and Edwin Hawkins, Walter Hawkins, Lynette Hawkins Stephens with The Hawkins Family appeared on the album.

This LP ended a four-year hiatus for the band, with Maurice White reforming the group by bringing back longtime members Verdine White, Philip Bailey, Andrew Woolfolk and Ralph Johnson. Touch the World also marked the debut of former Commodores guitarist Sheldon Reynolds to the lineup while Sonny Emory went on to fill the drum chair.

Singles
The song "System of Survival" was written by an unknown composer known as Skylark. Issued as a single, it reached number one on both the Billboard Hot R&B Songs and Dance Club Songs charts and was nominated for a Soul Train Award for Best R&B/Soul Single – Group, Band or Duo. Another single, "Thinking of You" also reached number one on the Billboard Dance Club Songs chart and peaked at number 3 on the Billboard Hot R&B Songs chart.

Critical reception

David Emerson of The Boston Globe called Touch the World "one of their toughest and most convincing records ever".  With a 3 out of 4 stars rating Connie Johnson of the Los Angeles Times declared  "Touch the World, while not great, is still good enough to further secure EWF's niche in pop/funk history".
Chris Heim of the Chicago Tribune wrote  "Sweet and silky ballads, the distinctive vocals of Maurice White and Philip Bailey, and an overall air of humanitarian concern continue to be obvious group hallmarks. But there is a tougher, sadder and more predictible atmosphere here as the group discovers it hasn`t been so easy to Getaway from grim realities."
With a 3 out of 4 stars rating Ken Tucker of the Philadelphia Inquirer called Touch the World "the best album this vocal group has released since 'That's the Way of the World".  People described the LP as "a class operation and an attractive return" that "can stand on its own merits."
Roe Hoeburger of Rolling Stone gave a 3 out of 5 stars rating and found "Bailey’s falsetto sounds as pure and piercing as ever, but he often needs White’s sly, low counterpunch to bring him back from the stratosphere." Hoeburger added "Yet White and Bailey’s words were always simple, delivered with a lot of pride and passion, enough of which they’ve regained to make Earth, Wind and Fire once more significant and timely." 
Pamela Bloom of High Fidelity proclaimed "the message, as always,
is stop, step back, and turn up your light".

Touch the World was also nominated for a Soul Train Award in the category of Best R&B/Soul Album of the Year.

Track listing

Credits

Personnel
Arrangement, Guitar, Backing Vocals, Synthesizer, Programming – Attala Zane Giles
Arrangement, Composing, Drums, Keyboards, Programming, Piano – Bill Meyers
Arrangement – Rev. Oliver Wells
Arrangement, Piano – George Duke
Drum Programming, Programming – Danny Sembello
Backing Vocals – Jeanette Williams, Wanda Vaughn
Co-producer, Composer Sequencing – Wayne Vaughn
Backing Vocals – The Hawkins Family
Bass – Nathan East
Drums, Keyboards, Programmed By – Dan DeSouza
Drums – Ricky Lawson
Drums – Jeff Porcaro
Engineer – Paul Brown
Electric Guitar, Synthesizer, Drum Programming – Preston Glass
Guitar – Paul Jackson Jr.
Guitar – Ray Fuller
Guitar – Sheldon Reynolds
Composer, Drum Programming, Synthesizer, Backing Vocals – Skylark
Horns – Gary Grant, Marc Russo, Wayne Wallace
Horns, Arranged By – Jerry Hey
Lead Vocals, Backing Vocals – Philip Bailey
Lead Vocals, Backing Vocals, Vocoder – Maurice White
Mixing – Dave Rideau
Programming, Drum Programming, Sequencing – Rhett Lawrence
Programming, Keyboards – Larry Williams
Saxophone, Soloist – Andrew Woolfolk

Production
Art Direction – Tony Lane, Nancy Donald
Co-producer – Philip Bailey (tracks: A2, B4 to B5), Wayne Vaughn (tracks: A3)
Photography By – Max Aguilera Hellweg
Producer – Bill Meyers (tracks: A5), Maurice White (tracks: A1 to A4, B1 to B5), Preston Glass (tracks: A1)

Charts and certifications

Charts

Albums

Singles

Certifications

References

1987 albums
Earth, Wind & Fire albums
Albums produced by Maurice White
Columbia Records albums